Greenville City Hall may refer to:

Greenville City Hall (Greenville, Alabama), listed on the National Register of Historic Places in Butler County, Alabama
Greenville City Hall (Greenville, Kentucky), listed on the National Register of Historic Places in Muhlenberg County, Kentucky
Greenville City Hall (Greenville, Mississippi), a Mississippi Landmark
Greenville City Hall (Greenville, South Carolina), listed on the National Register of Historic Places in Greenville County, South Carolina